Michael Hwang  is a Singaporean lawyer and arbitrator. In 1991, he was appointed Judicial Commissioner of the Supreme Court of Singapore. He completed his term in 1992, and in 1997 he was appointed one of the first eight Senior Counsel in Singapore. From 2008 to 2010, he was the President of the Law Society of Singapore. In 2010, he became the Chief Justice of the Dubai International Financial Centre Courts.

In 2014, he was awarded the Pierre de Coubertin Medal by the International Olympic Committee for his work with the International Council of Arbitration for Sports, which operates the Court of Arbitration for Sport.

References

Anglo-Chinese School alumni
Singaporean people of Hakka descent
People from Meixian District
Singaporean Senior Counsel
20th-century Singaporean lawyers
Year of birth missing (living people)
Living people
Recipients of the Pierre de Coubertin medal
Judges of the Supreme Court of Singapore
21st-century Singaporean lawyers